Langston Wilde is a fictional character from ABC soap opera One Life to Live portrayed by Brittany Underwood from May 17, 2006, to April 12, 2011. Langston is Dorian Lord's adoptive daughter and very similar to her. In January 2011, it was announced that Underwood would be exiting the show in the spring in a "storyline dictated" exit. She was slated to appear in the Vicker Man premiere episodes alongside Markko in July 2011 but could not due to scheduling conflicts. She made a return appearance during the final ABC episode of the show on January 13, 2012.

Character background
Langston is first seen while Starr Manning is being bullied by classmates from school. The two soon become best friends. Starr jumps off of a cliff at the stone quarry to take a dive into the water below. Before landing in the water, Starr hits her head and is taken to the hospital, where she fakes amnesia. Langston learns of Starr's ruse to try to reunite her parents. Starr soon comes clean with her parents about faking amnesia.

Langston and Starr begin high school, where the two gain an enemy in Britney Jennings. Starr soon meets a football player named Cole Thornhart, and they begin dating. Britney, who has a crush on Cole, desperately tries several times to break the two up. Starr and Cole go into a bedroom during a party, and refusing to have sex, Starr is frightened when an angry Cole tears the room apart and rips Starr's shirt. Britney poses as Starr as she calls the police on Cole, who later arrest him. Langston quickly turns on Cole, who has been kicked off of the football team for using steroids.

Starr is horrified to learn that Cole's mother is Marty Saybrooke, the woman that her father Todd had raped several years earlier; Starr is able to forgive Cole, but her parents forbid the two from seeing one another. Langston soon forgives Cole for hurting her friend. Cole and Starr, desperate to be together, decide to run away with the help of Langston. Todd catches the two before they leave, nearly strangling Cole. For Cole's safety, Starr breaks up with him.

Langston signs Starr up for the school musical, and Starr in turn sets Langston up to write the musical. Working with English teacher Marcie McBain, the musical is a success, and Langston soon begins dating Markko Rivera, a boy who annoys her.

A few months into their relationship, Markko becomes concerned about the constant absence of Langston's parents. Sensing that something is not right, Starr's aunt, Dorian hires private investigator Rex Balsom to dig up information on Langston. Dorian learns that Langston has been orphaned and living on her own for over a year.

Langston cannot believe that Dorian would pry into private information regarding her life. During a conversation at school, Langston talks with Starr about her parents' death, and they are overheard by Britney. Britney contacts Social Services, and Langston is horrified when she is placed in foster care. Starr's mother, Blair, is all set to become Langston's foster mother when she is called out of town. In turn, Dorian chooses to become Langston's guardian. After things are official, Langston moves into Dorian's home and happily continues her relationship with Markko.

After Starr becomes pregnant with Cole's baby, she decides to have an abortion before Cole or her family discover that she is pregnant. At the last minute, Langston gives Cole the address where Starr is. Cole stops Starr from aborting their baby, telling her to take the time to think of what is best. Cole and Starr, with fake ID's, run away to Virginia Beach.

Dorian catches Langston trying to hide a pregnancy book and suspects that Langston is pregnant; Dorian takes Langston to have an abortion. Langston decides to tell Dorian the truth. Cole and Starr are soon found and brought back to Llanview.

In August 2008, Clint Buchanan hatches a plan to get the family business (Buchanan Enterprises) back from Dorian. Clint sends Jared to Colombia to bring Langston's long-lost uncle Ray Montez to Llanview. During this time, Dorian makes the decision to adopt Langston. On Christmas Day 2008, Dorian becomes her adoptive mother.

Langston forms a bond with her cousin, Lola, who develops a crush on Markko. Once Langston puts an end to Lola's schemes, she makes plans with Markko to have sex on prom night. After learning of their plans, Lola sabotages the French condoms given to Langston by Dorian. While high on LSD, Lola admits to what she has done, and Dorian stops Langston and Markko from using the condoms.

Using Markko's condoms, Langston and Markko enjoy their first night together. Unfortunately, their happiness does not last long when, at their graduation party, drunk Dorian tells Markko's conservative and religious parents that he and Langston had sex. Both furious, his parents forbid Markko to see her, even though he is 18, as they believe she is a bad influence on him.

When Markko refuses to break up with Langston, they disown him, which puts a strain on his and Langston's relationship, even as they attempt to work through it. When they do, they move in with Starr and Cole.

A man from Markko's past, teacher's assistant named Robert Ford, begins making moves on Langston. They kiss twice and on March 1, 2010, they have sex for the first time. This has been going on for a month. She seems to like having sex with Ford. Starr later finds out, because Ford left their house and Starr noted that Langston was acting weird. This along with fact that Starr had found an empty condom wrapper on the floor.

Starr agrees not to tell Markko about Langston and Ford's affair. Langston does not know which man she will keep, but it is looking like she is ready to break up with Markko to be with Ford, to Starr's disdain. In April, Langston tells Starr that she is breaking up with Ford to stay with Markko. However, when Langston goes to see Ford, she tells him that she lied to Starr and will continue to have sex with him while dating Markko.

On prom night, Markko catches Ford and Langston in an embrace and learns of their affair. He angrily confronts both of them, punches Ford, and leaves Langston. Markko leaves town to go to UCLA in July 2010, and temporarily returns to town in fall of 2010 to help his father, who undergoes heart surgery. Langston nearly pursues a relationship with Ford but quickly ends in after learning that he slept with a mentally incapacitated Jessica Buchanan.

During Markko's temporary return, he and Langston forgive each other and start to form a friendship. However, they are not successful in trying to get back together, and Markko leaves town again for UCLA, leaving Langston behind.

On April 11, 2011, Langston is shown to be somewhat happier since her breakup with Ford. Markko returns from LA, and Dorian tells her that she wants her to work on the David Vickers film with him. On April 12, 2011, Langston shares one last sad moment with Starr, promises they will see each other someday, and leaves for California with Markko.

Langston appears on the final episode on January 13, 2012, in California with Starr and Markko. She is first seen mourning the death of Ford, when Cole arrives and gives them a hug. She assures Starr and Cole that everything will be alright.

On the March 20, 2013, episode of General Hospital, a frantic Langston calls Starr to return to Los Angeles. It remains unknown what Langston's reason was for wanting Starr to return.

References

External links
Langston Wilde profile – ABC.com (archived)

Television characters introduced in 2006
One Life to Live characters
Fictional orphans
Adoptee characters in television
Fictional writers
Fictional Hispanic and Latino American people
American female characters in television